Kanniyath Ahmed Musliyar (Arabic:كنّيت احمد مسليار, Malayalam: കണ്ണിയത്തു അഹ്മദ്‌ മുസ്‌ലിയാര്‍) former president of Samastha Kerala Jamiyyathul Ulama, was a 20th-century scholar of Muslim Kerala. He championed many successful orations against the noval groups emerged in the very century and famous as the teacher of the greatest sunni ash'ari scholar E.K Aboobacker Musliyar. He was notable for his piety and his extraordinary command in the Islamic jurisprudence. He was blessed with numerous students who later became shining star in the sunni horizon.

Early life
Kanniyath Ahmed Muslliyar was born to Kanniyath Avaran Kutty and Kadeeja in 1900 January 17. He was enrolled in the Darse (masjid based education system) in 1910 and accessed to Malayalam and English education through a Nair teacher. He got admission in Vazhakkad Darul Uloom, founded under the reformation leader Chalilakath Kunahmed Haji, and was accompanied by Sayyid Twaha Aluwai, Kutubi Muhammed Musliyar, Cherussery Ahmed Kutty Musliyar, KM Moulavi. After the retirement of Chalilakath Kunahmed Haji, Velori Abdul Azeez became principal of the institution and Kanniyath Usthad imbibed the Hadeeth knowledge from him and later fetched Ijazath ( permission to narrate). In 1922, Cherussery Ahmed Kutty Musliyar was appointed as the dean of the institution and Kanniyath obtained the trough in Arabic language, astrology and logic. Cherussery Ahmed Kutty Musliyar was attracted in the personal traits of Kanniyath. After the voluntary retirement of Cherussery Ahmed Kutty Musliyar in 1926, Kutubi Muhammed Musliyar took the guardianship of the institution and he appointed Kanniyath as his assistant.

Teaching
After the years long service in Darul Uloom under Kutubi Musliyar, Ayancher Musliyar, Pallipuram Abdul Khader Musliyar, he was appointed as the main Mudarris (professor in Darse) in Odattin Palli, Thalassery, Mattool Muhyaddin Palli, Parambath Palli, Morayoor Palli. He also served as Mudarris at Ponnani Valiya Masjid, which is known as Makah of Kerala. His tenure as the professor in Jamia Nooria Pattikad with Shamsul Ulama is the golden phase of the Jamia Nooria.

In Samastha
He was invited to the Mushawar of Samastha from its establishment in 1926. After the resignation of the Sadakutulla Musliyar, then the president of the organization, in the general body under the chairmanship of Vapor PV Muhammed Koya (1967, May 6), he was elected unanimously as the president of Samastha in 1967, May 25.

Against the Noval group
He turned against Salafism and other noval ideology with his words and pen and became nightmare for them. He engaged in debate with them, but He had admired them in various points,  He initiated the famous debate at Nadappuram in Kozhikode district and was the spearhead of the Sunni horde.

Death
He died on 19 September 1993 (Rabeel Akhar 2, 1414). Hundred and lakhs of the people from the various sector of the religions paid homage to their leader.

References

1993 deaths
1900 births
Kerala Sunni-Shafi'i scholars